The Roar of the Rails is an American children's television series that aired on CBS from October to December 1948, and in October to December 1949. Each episode is 15 minutes long and was essentially a live commercial for the toy manufacturer A. C. Gilbert Company. The series is notable as being one of the first infomercials to air on a major television network.

Overview
To sell American Flyer electric trains and other A.C. Gilbert products, the live series appeared for the eight weeks leading to Christmas 1948 and again in 1949.  The format featured a retired railroad worker reminiscing dramatically about olden times.  Each story featured actors plus in-studio electric trains and elaborate layouts to substitute for authentic train footage as the old-timer told his grandson exciting stories of earlier times in railroading.

Episode status
Seven 1949 kinescoped episodes of the series exist at the Library of Congress in the J. Fred and Leslie W. MacDonald Collection. The episodes contain complete commercials for American Flyer electric trains, Erector sets, Microscopes, and Chemistry sets.
The episodes include:

 "Episode at Red Gulch Siding" (aired October 24, 1949)
 "Runaway Trains" (aired October 31, 1949) 
 "The Johnstown Flood" (aired November 7, 1949) 
 "Operation Explosion" (aired November 14, 1949) 
 "Death Valley Scotty" (aired November 21, 1949) 
 "Baltimore Fire" (aired November 28, 1949) 
 "Acme Plant Fire"  (aired December 12, 1949)

See also
1948-49 United States network television schedule

References

External links
 

1948 American television series debuts
1949 American television series endings
1940s American children's television series
Black-and-white American television shows
CBS original programming
English-language television shows
Television series about rail transport
Toy trains